The Great Divide is the fourth studio album by Australian blues and roots band Busby Marou. It was released on 27 September 2019.

The album draws from many aspects of the duo's personal and professional lives. The band told the National Indigenous Times "We aren't writing about one night stands or little love stories anymore, we're writing about happy families, and dealing with real life. It's really just getting all these conversations started." adding "We have a song called 'The Great Divide' and it's about mental illness and a few of our mates who have struggled. Some of our mates have taken their own lives and we hope this is a way to start talking about it."

Track listing

Charts

Release history

References

2019 albums
Busby Marou albums